Guillaume Martin (born 9 June 1993) is a French cyclist who currently rides for UCI WorldTeam .

Career
In June 2017, he was named in the startlist for the Tour de France. While not necessarily considered a pre-race favourite for overall victory in the general classification, Martin finished just outside the top 20 in 2017 and 2018 and just outside the top 10 in 2019.

Cofidis (2020–present)
Having rode for  since the start of the 2016 season, Martin joined  ahead of the 2020 season. In August, Martin finished third overall at the Critérium du Dauphiné. He then rode in the Tour de France, in which he held third place overall from stages seven to twelve, before ultimately finishing eleventh overall. In October, he was named in the startlist for the Vuelta a España. Having lost over ten minutes across the first three stages, Martin formed part of the breakaway on three consecutive stages, taking the mountains classification lead following stage seven – a lead he did not relinquish for the remainder of the race.

Martin contested his fifth consecutive Tour de France in 2021; after spending the first week outside the top 25 places overall, Martin moved into the top ten following stage nine, after being part of the day's breakaway. On the fourteenth stage, Martin moved up to second place overall – behind Tadej Pogačar – having been part of a seven-rider move that attacked around halfway through the stage, and gained five minutes on the peloton. He ceded almost four minutes the following day, on the first Pyrenean stage, dropping back to ninth overall; he ultimately finished the race in eighth place. Contesting the Vuelta a España for the second straight year, Martin was part of a 31-rider breakaway on the tenth stage – he had entered the stage almost ten minutes down on race leader Primož Roglič – which ultimately splintered on the day's categorised climb, the Puerto de Almáchar. Martin finished in the second chase group, moving up to second overall behind the new race leader, Odd Christian Eiking. In the final week, Martin lost more than four minutes to Roglič on consecutive stages – as he regained the race lead – and as a result, Martin dropped to an eventual finish of ninth place in the general classification.

Martin started the 2022 season with a block of racing in France, taking a third-place overall finish at the Tour des Alpes-Maritimes et du Var, his first such stage race finish since the 2020 Critérium du Dauphiné. The following weekend, Martin finished fifth at the Faun-Ardèche Classic and second at La Drôme Classic, finishing three seconds behind winner Jonas Vingegaard in the latter. At Paris–Nice, Martin gradually made his way up the general classification, moving up to a ninth-place overall finish on the final weekend of the race.

Personal life
Born in Paris, Martin grew up in Norman Switzerland. His father was a teacher of aikido, which Guillaume practiced during his childhood, and his mother was a drama teacher. He holds a master's degree in philosophy from Paris Nanterre University and is the author of two books, one of which is Socrates By Bike.

Major results

2011
 10th Road race, UEC European Junior Road Championships
2012
 9th Overall Ronde de l'Isard
2014
 4th Overall Tour Alsace
2015
 1st Liège–Bastogne–Liège Espoirs
 4th Overall Ronde de l'Isard
 10th Overall Tour de l'Avenir
1st Stage 5
2016
 2nd Overall Tour of Austria
 4th Overall Tour de l'Ain
 8th Overall Rhône-Alpes Isère Tour
2017
 1st  Overall Giro della Toscana
1st Stage 2
 1st  Overall Tour du Gévaudan Languedoc-Roussillon
1st Stage 1
 1st Stage 4 Tour du Limousin
 3rd Overall Tour du Jura
 6th Polynormande
 7th Coppa Sabatini
 10th Tour du Doubs
2018
 1st  Overall Circuit de la Sarthe
1st Stage 3
 3rd Tour du Finistère
 3rd Boucles de l'Aulne
 4th Tour du Doubs
 5th Road race, National Road Championships
 5th Grand Prix de Wallonie
 5th Grand Prix La Marseillaise
 9th Overall Deutschland Tour
2019
 2nd Overall Giro di Sicilia
1st Stage 4
 2nd Trofeo Campos, Porreres, Felanitx, Ses Salines
 3rd Overall Tour du Limousin
 3rd Memorial Marco Pantani
 3rd Tour du Doubs
 5th Overall Vuelta a Burgos
 5th Tour du Finistère
 6th Gran Premio Bruno Beghelli
 6th Grand Prix de Plumelec-Morbihan
 7th Trofeo Andratx–Lloseta
 7th Trofeo Serra de Tramuntana
 8th Overall Volta a Catalunya
 8th Faun-Ardèche Classic
 8th La Drôme Classic
2020
 Vuelta a España
1st  Mountains classification
 Combativity award Stages 5, 12 & 15
 3rd Overall Critérium du Dauphiné
 3rd Faun-Ardèche Classic
 3rd Mont Ventoux Dénivelé Challenge
 4th La Drôme Classic
 7th Overall Vuelta a San Juan
1st  Mountains classification
 8th Overall Tour de l'Ain
2021
 1st Mercan'Tour Classic Alpes-Maritimes 
 6th Overall Paris–Nice
 8th Overall Tour de France
 8th Veneto Classic
 9th Overall Vuelta a España
2022
 1st  Overall Tour de l'Ain
1st Stage 2
 2nd La Drôme Classic
 3rd Overall Tour des Alpes-Maritimes et du Var
 3rd Coppa Sabatini
 4th Polynormande
 5th Faun-Ardèche Classic
 5th Mont Ventoux Dénivelé Challenge
 6th Coppa Agostoni
 6th Japan Cup
 8th Overall Volta a Catalunya
 8th Overall Tour du Limousin
 9th Overall Paris–Nice
 9th Giro della Toscana
 10th Overall Tour de Wallonie
2023
 8th Faun-Ardèche Classic

General classification results timeline

References

External links

1993 births
Living people
French male cyclists
Cyclists from Paris
Olympic cyclists of France
Cyclists at the 2020 Summer Olympics